Postal codes in Armenia consist of four digits.  Until April 1, 2006, they consisted of six digits.  For example, the previous postal code for the Foreign Ministry was Yerevan 375010 and is now Yerevan 0010.

References

External links
 Postal-Codes.net: Armenia
 Haypost: The Armenian Postal Service, official website

Armenia
Postal codes
Postal system of Armenia